Potteries may refer to:

 Pottery, or pottery manufacturing

Places in England
 Staffordshire Potteries, the Stoke-on-Trent area, known as the  after its once-important ceramics industry
 The Potteries Urban Area, a conurbation distinct from, and covering a larger area than, the Staffordshire Potteries
 Potteries Shopping Centre, a shopping centre in Hanley, Stoke-on-Trent

Other uses
 Potteries, Shrewsbury and North Wales Railway, England and Wales
 Potteries dialect, of Midlands English